Jerry Molyneaux (October 1955 – 26 July 2016) was an Irish Gaelic games administrator. His career included almost every role in Gaelic football and hurling, including player, coach, manager, selector, chairman, secretary, PRO, and referee.

Honours

Management

Granagh-Ballingarry
Limerick Junior Hurling Championship (1): 1998
West Limerick Junior Hurling Championship (1): 1998

Glin
Limerick Under-21 Football Championship (1)

Newmarket
Ducon Cup (1)

Lixnaw
Kerry Senior Hurling Championship (1): 1999

References

1955 births
2016 deaths
Gaelic football coaches
Gaelic football managers
Gaelic football referees
Gaelic football selectors
Gaelic games administrators
Hurling coaches
Hurling managers
Hurling referees
Hurling selectors